This is a list of notable alumni, faculty, and benefactors of the Saint Joseph's University.

Notable alumni

Politics, law, and activism
 William A. Barrett – former U.S. Representative (D-PA)
 Melissa Brown – ophthalmologist; three-time candidate for the U.S. House of Representatives (R-PA)
 E. James Burke – chief justice of the Wyoming Supreme Court
 William T. Cahill – six-term U.S. Representative (R-NJ); 46th Governor of New Jersey
John Caulfield – Chief of Mission Havana Cuba
 Charles F. Dougherty – two-term U.S. Representative (R-PA) 
 Kevin M. Downing – attorney for Miller and Chevalier; former prosecutor with the Department of Justice Tax Division handling the KPMG tax shelter fraud and UBS tax evasion scandal
 Charles J. Dunlap, Jr. – Deputy Judge Advocate General, Headquarters United States Air Force, Washington, D.C.
 Clare G. Fenerty – former U.S. Representative from Pennsylvania
 Thomas M. Foglietta – former U.S. Representative; U.S. Ambassador to Italy
 William J. Green, III – former U.S. Representative; former mayor of Philadelphia
 Richard J. Hughes – former governor of New Jersey; former Chief Justice of the New Jersey Supreme Court; chairman of the Credentials Committee, 1968 Democratic National Convention
George R. Johnson – Pennsylvania State Representative for the 166th district (1967-1972)
 Ronald T. Kadish – Lieutenant General, United States Air Force; former director of the Ballistic Missile Defense Organization and the Missile Defense Agency
 John F. Lehman – Secretary of the Navy under President Ronald Reagan, author, and member of the 9/11 Commission
 Frank LoBiondo – U.S. Representative (R-NJ)
Thomas McCreesh – Pennsylvania State Senator for the 4th district from 1959 to 1968 and the 8th district from 1969 to 1974
 Kathleen McGinty – secretary, Pennsylvania Department of Environmental Protection; former advisor to Al Gore and Barack Obama
 Joseph McKenna – former associate justice of the United States Supreme Court
Nicholas Micozzie – Pennsylvania State Representative for the 163rd district (1979–2014)
 Francis J. Myers – Pennsylvania State Senator; U.S. Representative (D-PA)
 Drew O'Keefe – U.S. Attorney for the Eastern District of Pennsylvania
 Michael O'Pake – Democratic Pennsylvania State Senator, 11th Senatorial District
 Lawrence W. Pierce – lawyer, federal judge 
 Dominic Pileggi – Republican Leader of the Pennsylvania State Senate
 Francis R. Smith – former U.S. Representative (D-PA)
 Charles A. Waters – Pennsylvania State Treasurer, Auditor General, and judge

Business
Andrew von Eschenbach – acting chairman of FDA; former director of the National Cancer Institute; director at BioTime, a biotechnology company
Chris Gheysens (MBA 2005) – president and chief executive officer of Wawa Inc.
Daniel J. Hilferty III – president and CEO of Independence Blue Cross
Keith Leaphart – entrepreneur, philanthropist and physician
Sister Mary Scullion – co-founder and executive director, Project H.O.M.E.

Religion
 Rev. William J. Byron, S.J. – priest of the Society of Jesus; former president of The Catholic University of America and the University of Scranton
 John Patrick Cardinal Foley – Grand Master of the Order of the Holy Sepulchre
 David Hollenbach, S.J. – director of the Center for Human Rights and International Justice at Boston College

Athletics
 Cliff Anderson – former NBA player for Los Angeles Lakers, Cleveland Cavaliers, Philadelphia 76ers
 Mike Bantom – former NBA player for Phoenix Suns, Seattle SuperSonics, New Jersey Nets, Indiana Pacers, and Philadelphia 76ers; silver medalist with U.S. team in 1972 Summer Olympics
 Pat McFarland - former ABA player for Denver Rockets, Denver Nuggets and San Diego Sails, Phila. Big Five Hall of Fame
DeAndre' Bembry – NBA player for Atlanta Hawks, first-round selection in 2016 NBA Draft
 Debbie Black – former player for Connecticut Sun of WNBA; assistant coach, Ohio State University's women's basketball team
 Norman Black – former CBA player for Lancaster Red Roses, NBA player for Detroit Pistons and PBA player
 Pat Calathes – pro basketball player (VTB United League; Israel Basketball Premier League)
 Pat Carroll – SJU and professional basketball player
 Bill Cubit – football coach, former head coach at University of Illinois, Widener and Western Michigan
 James "Bruiser" Flint – SJU basketball player, assistant coach at Indiana, former head coach of UMass and Drexel University
 Langston Galloway – NBA player for New York Knicks, New Orleans Pelicans, Sacramento Kings, Detroit Pistons
 Matt Guokas – former NBA player; head coach of Philadelphia 76ers and Orlando Magic; television broadcaster
 Matt Guokas, Sr. – player for NBA's Philadelphia Warriors; broadcast games for NFL's Philadelphia Eagles for over 30 years
 Gerald Hunsicker – executive with Major League Baseball's Tampa Bay Rays; former general manager of New York Mets and Houston Astros
 Dwayne Jones – professional basketball player
 Joe Lunardi – ESPN college basketball analyst and creator of bracketology
 Jim Lynam – former NBA head coach of San Diego/Los Angeles Clippers, Philadelphia 76ers, Washington Bullets and head coach of American University, Fairfield and SJU
 Ann "Muffet" McGraw – former basketball player at SJU; women's basketball coach at Notre Dame
 Jack McKinney – former NBA head coach of Los Angeles Lakers, Indiana Pacers (1981 Coach of the Year), and Kansas City Kings
Isaiah Miles (born 1994) - basketball player in the Israeli Basketball Premier League
 Jamie Moyer – former professional pitcher for Major League Baseball's Philadelphia Phillies and Seattle Mariners; member of Phillies' broadcast team
 Jameer Nelson – 2004 Naismith College Player of the Year; NBA guard for Denver Nuggets
 Ahmad Nivins – professional basketball player
 Jim O'Brien – former head coach of NBA's Indiana Pacers, Philadelphia 76ers and Boston Celtics
 Vince Papale – former professional football player for Philadelphia Eagles and inspiration for Disney movie Invincible
 William Warren Phillips, aka "Bill Phillips" – professional basketball player
 Jack Ramsay – Hall of Fame basketball coach; former NBA head coach of Philadelphia 76ers, Buffalo Braves, Portland Trail Blazers, and Indiana Pacers
 Ronald Roberts – former power forward for Philadelphia 76ers
 George Senesky – former NBA player; championship-winning coach 
 Mike Teti – three-time Olympic rower; 12-time national team member; former USRowing men's coach (1997–2008); current University of California, Berkeley coach; three-time Olympic coach (1996 – MLW4-, 2000 – M8+, 2004 – M8+)
 Delonte West – NBA guard, Dallas Mavericks, Cleveland Cavaliers, Boston Celtics
 Paul Westhead – former NBA head coach for Los Angeles Lakers, Chicago Bulls, and Denver Nuggets; WNBA head coach for Phoenix Mercury, former head coach for Loyola Marymount University
 Jack Whitaker – Emmy award-winning sports broadcaster, CBS and ABC
 Chazz Witherspoon – professional heavyweight boxer

Arts, entertainment, and media
 Marshmello – electronic music producer and DJ
 Joseph Ignatius Breen – film censor
 Kevin Brennan - former Saturday Night Live writer and comedian
 Glenn Brenner – Washington, D.C, sportscasting legend for WUSA-TV
 Richard Corliss – writer and editor, focuses on film
 Tim Martin Gleason – actor, singer 
 Jeanne Marie Laskas – columnist, journalist, and book author
 Gregg Murphy – Emmy Award-winning journalist for CN8, specializes in sports
 Joe Queenan – author, critic, and humorist

Education
 William J. Byron, S.J. – Jesuit; former president of the University of Scranton (1975–82); former president of Catholic University of America (1982–92); former Interim President of Loyola University New Orleans (2003–04); former president of St. Joseph's Preparatory School (2006–08); current professor of business and society at Saint Joseph's University
 Emile B. De Sauzé – language educator noted for developing the conversational method of learning a language
 Patrick Maggitti, first provost of Villanova University and former dean of the Villanova School of Business
 Peter J. Woolley – political scientist, author, founding director of the opinion research group PublicMind

President
Saint Joseph's University was technically without a president for a period of months, with Senior Vice President John Smithson serving as interim president. He took on the role when the university's 26th president, Rev. Timothy R. Lannon, S.J., stepped down to assume the presidency at his own alma mater, Creighton University.

On January 24, 2011, the board of trustees elected Rev. Joseph M. O'Keefe, S.J. as the 27th President of the university. He later stepped down, citing health issues; the university subsequently selected Smithson, a former chair of the board of trustees, to serve as interim president, and directed its efforts to a Jesuit-only search. Under Smithson, the university began taking steps to complete its Plan 2020: Gateway to the Future.

On November 10, 2011, the university's board of trustees announced that it had selected Rev. C. Kevin Gillespie, S.J., Associate Provost of University Centers at Loyola University Chicago, as the 27th president of the university. Gillespie is a member of the Class of 1972 and had served as a trustee since 2006. He is only the second president to also be an alumnus of the university; the first was Rev. Cornelius Gillespie, S.J., who served from 1900 to 1907, and again from 1908 to 1909. Gillespie was formally presented at a reception on November 11, 2011, and formally assumed the presidency on July 1, 2012. Until that time, the university announced that John Smithson would continue his role as interim president.

Gillespie was inaugurated in a ceremony on October 12, 2012, which culminated a week of school-pride and university activities. Other inauguration week events included a day of community service, an evening of song and prayer, a Mass of Thanksgiving, and a softball game and barbecue for faculty, staff, and students.

Coaches
 Ian Crookenden – men's tennis coach
 Don D'Ambra – men's soccer coach 
 Fritz Hamburg – men's baseball coach
 Billy Lange – men's basketball coach

Notable faculty
 Joe Lunardi – ESPN bracketologist

References

Philadelphia-related lists
Lists of people by university or college in Pennsylvania